Glaspalast Sindelfingen is an indoor arena, in Sindelfingen, Germany. The arena holds 5,250 people. It is primarily used for indoor athletics and concerts.

KISS performed at the arena during their Lick It Up Tour on November 4, 1983.

World Masters Athletics held its first Indoor Championships here in 2004.

References

External links
Venue homepage

Indoor arenas in Germany
Indoor track and field venues
Buildings and structures in Böblingen (district)
Sports venues in Baden-Württemberg